Dr. Lore Kutschera (b. 14 September 1917, Villach, d. 16 October 2008, Klagenfurt) was an Austrian botanist, ecologist, phytosociologist, and educator known for her research of plant root systems and phytosociology in agricultural contexts.  In 1962 she received her doctorate at the University of Natural Resources and Life Sciences, Vienna, and later in life received several state awards form Klagenfurt for her scientific achievements.  In 1982, she founded the International Society of Root Research.

References 

 1917 births
 2008 deaths
20th-century Austrian botanists
20th-century Austrian women scientists
Austrian women botanists